Amyema mackayensis, the mangrove mistletoe,  is a species of flowering plant within the genus Amyema, an epiphytic hemiparasitic plant of the family Loranthaceae native to Australia, and found along its northern and eastern coasts in New South Wales, Queensland, the Northern Territory and Western Australia, and also in New Guinea.

Description
The opposite flat leaves have a distinct stem and are thick, fleshy and round, and can be up to 6 cm in length. 
The inflorescence is an umbel of two or more triads or tetrads (flowering in a group of four). The mature buds are terete (long and cylindrical) or angular,  and smooth or with just a few scattered hairs.

Ecology
A. mackayensis is found along the coast and in maritime communities, on mangroves, in particular on the Grey Mangrove (Avicennia marina)  Moss & Kendall comment that there is evidence that this mistletoe accumulates excess salt loads in leaves which it sheds, and thus reduce its salt load.

Taxonomy
A. mackayensis was first described by Blakely in 1922 as Loranthus mackayensis, but in 1929 was placed in the genus Amyema by Danser.

References

mackayensis
Eudicots of Western Australia
Flora of the Northern Territory
Flora of Queensland
Flora of New South Wales
Flora of New Guinea
Parasitic plants
Epiphytes
Taxa named by William Blakely
Plants described in 1922